Ketf-e Gusheh (also Romanized as Ketf-e Gūsheh) is a village in Donbaleh Rud-e Shomali Rural District, Dehdez District, Izeh County, Khuzestan Province, Iran. At the 2006 census, its population was 157, in 34 families.

References 

Populated places in Izeh County